The 1941 Boston Red Sox season was the 41st season in the franchise's Major League Baseball history. The Red Sox finished second in the American League (AL) with a record of 84 wins and 70 losses, 17 games behind the New York Yankees, who went on to win the 1941 World Series.

The Red Sox featured five future Hall of Famers: player-manager Joe Cronin, Bobby Doerr, Jimmie Foxx, Lefty Grove, and Ted Williams.

Offseason 
 Prior to 1941 season: Virgil Stallcup was signed as an amateur free agent by the Red Sox.

Regular season 
Williams was one of the biggest stories of the 1941 major league season, becoming, the last player to bat .400 (batting .406) in a full season. He led an offense that scored the most runs of any major league team. During the season, Williams reached base safely in 69 consecutive games.

Season standings

Record vs. opponents

Opening Day lineup

Roster

Player stats

Batting

Starters by position 
Note: Pos = Position; G = Games played; AB = At bats; H = Hits; Avg. = Batting average; HR = Home runs; RBI = Runs batted in

Other batters 
Note: G = Games played; AB = At bats; H = Hits; Avg. = Batting average; HR = Home runs; RBI = Runs batted in

Pitching

Starting pitchers 
Note: G = Games pitched; IP = Innings pitched; W = Wins; L = Losses; ERA = Earned run average; SO = Strikeouts

Other pitchers 
Note: G = Games pitched; IP = Innings pitched; W = Wins; L = Losses; ERA = Earned run average; SO = Strikeouts

Relief pitchers 
Note: G = Games pitched; W = Wins; L = Losses; SV = Saves; ERA = Earned run average; SO = Strikeouts

Awards and honors 
Ted Williams, 20th-century record, Highest on-base percentage in one season (.553)

All-Stars 
 Joe Cronin starting SS
 Dom DiMaggio reserve
 Bobby Doerr starting 2B
 Jimmie Foxx reserve
 Ted Williams starting LF

League top five finishers 
Dom DiMaggio
 #3 in AL in runs scored (117)

Dick Newsome
 #3 in AL in wins (19)

Charlie Wagner
 #3 in AL in ERA (3.07)

Ted Williams
 AL leader, reached base safely in 69 consecutive games
 MLB leader in batting average (.406)
 MLB leader in home runs (37)
 MLB leader in runs scored (135)
 MLB leader in on-base percentage (.553)
 MLB leader in slugging percentage (.735)
 MLB leader in walks drawn (147)
 #4 in AL in RBI (120)

Farm system 

Source:

References

External links
1941 Boston Red Sox team page at Baseball Reference
1941 Boston Red Sox season at baseball-almanac.com

Boston Red Sox seasons
Boston Red Sox
Boston Red Sox
1940s in Boston